Edmond Schmilovich was a Romanian-Israeli footballer and manager.

References

1921 births
1979 deaths
20th-century Israeli Jews
Jewish footballers
Israeli footballers
Israel international footballers
Romanian Jews
Jewish Romanian sportspeople
Hapoel Tel Aviv F.C. players
Hapoel Ramat Gan F.C. players
Hapoel Kfar Saba F.C. players
Israeli football managers
Israel national football team managers
Hapoel Kfar Saba F.C. managers
Hapoel Tel Aviv F.C. managers
Hapoel Petah Tikva F.C. managers
Hapoel Jerusalem F.C. managers
Maccabi Haifa F.C. managers
Association footballers not categorized by position
Romanian emigrants to Israel